The Campeonato Potiguar Second Division is the second tier of football league of the state of Rio Grande do Norte, Brazil.

List of champions

Campeonato Suburbano de Natal

Federação de Esportes do Rio Grande do Norte

Campeonato Potiguar Segunda Divisão

Titles by team

Teams in bold stills active.

By city

References

  
Potiguar